Allium tulipifolium is an Asian species of wild onion native to Xinjiang, Kazakhstan and Altay Krai. It is found at elevations of 600–1000 m.

Allium tulipifolium has round to egg-shaped bulbs up to 20 mm in diameter. Scape is up to 40 cm tall, round in cross-section. Leaves are flat, waxy, up to 2 cm across, much shorter than scape, with a pink or dark green margin. Umbel has many flowers, the tepals white with dark green or purple mid-veins.

References

External links
 line drawing of Allium tulipifolium, Flora of China Illustrations vol. 24, fig. 229, 1-4  
 photo of isotype of Allium tulipifolium, herbarium specimen at Missouri Botanical Garden

tulipifolium
Onions
Flora of temperate Asia
Plants described in 1830